The 2022 Yokkaichi Challenger was a professional tennis tournament played on hard courts. It was the 2nd edition of the tournament which was part of the 2022 ATP Challenger Tour. It took place in Yokkaichi, Japan between 21 and 27 November 2022.

Singles main-draw entrants

Seeds

 1 Rankings are as of 14 November 2022.

Other entrants
The following players received wildcards into the singles main draw:
  Shinji Hazawa
  Shintaro Imai
  Naoki Nakagawa

The following player received entry into the singles main draw using a protected ranking:
  Yūichi Sugita

The following players received entry from the qualifying draw:
  Lee Duck-hee
  Yuki Mochizuki
  Makoto Ochi
  Keisuke Saitoh
  Shuichi Sekiguchi
  Colin Sinclair

The following player received entry as a lucky loser:
  James Trotter

Champions

Singles

  Yosuke Watanuki def.  Frederico Ferreira Silva 6–2, 6–2.

Doubles

  Hsu Yu-hsiou /  Yuta Shimizu def.  Masamichi Imamura /  Rio Noguchi 7–6(7–2), 6–4.

References

2022 ATP Challenger Tour
2022 in Japanese tennis
November 2022 sports events in Japan
Tennis tournaments in Japan